The Christian Democratic Youth Appeal (Dutch: Christen-Democratische Jongeren Appèl), officially abbreviated as CDJA, is the youth organisation of the political party Christian Democratic Appeal in the Netherlands. It came about via the merging of the political youth organisations ARJOS, CHJO and the KVP-jongerenorganisatie.

The organisation is affiliated with Christian Democrats locally, nationally and internationally. Throughout the Netherlands there are about fifty divisions active of the CDJA. These organisations are primarily concerned with provincial and local politics.

The CDJA is involved not only with politics, but also is involved in programmes to increase mutual awareness and connectedness of CDJA youth throughout the organisation. In addition, it offers training and education to young people. While the CDJA is officially independent of the CDA, they do work closely together. While they share the same values, they can differ on opinion on subjects.

Ideology
Like the CDA the CDJA is a political organization that belongs to the Christian democratic movement. This political movement based on the ideas of the Christian Democracy .  This viewpoint includes: public justice, spread responsibility, solidarity and stewardship. Together with the CDA the CDJA see these as essential in politics and society.

International
The CDJA is a member of YEPP, the youth organization of the European People's Party. In addition, the CDJA active in organizations such as the YIMD that encourages multi-party democracy in developing countries in Africa and South America.

Chairperson

Former members
A number of prominent politicians have been former members, they include:
Maxime Verhagen
Jan Kees de Jager
Jack de Vries
Wim van de Camp
Corien Wortmann
Ad Koppejan
Mirjam Sterk

References

External links 
CDJA

Christian Democratic Appeal
Youth wings of political parties in the Netherlands